HMS A2 was an  submarine built for the Royal Navy in the first decade of the 20th century.

Design and description
A2 was a member of the first British class of submarines, although slightly larger, faster and more heavily armed than the lead ship, . They displaced  on the surface and  submerged. The A-class submarines had a crew of 2 officers and 9 ratings.

For surface running, the boats were powered by a single 16-cylinder  Wolseley petrol engine that drove one propeller shaft. When submerged the propeller was driven by a  electric motor. They could reach  on the surface and  underwater.

The boats were armed with two 18-inch (45 cm) torpedo tubes in the bow. They could carry a pair of reload torpedoes, but generally did not as doing so that they had to compensate for their weight by an equivalent weight of fuel.

Construction and career
Like all boats in her class, she was built at Vickers, Barrow-in-Furness. She was launched on 15 April 1903. During World War I, A2 served on harbour service at Portsmouth. She flooded after running aground in Bomb Ketch Lake in Portsmouth Harbour in January 1920 and was sold for scrap to H. G. Pound of Portsmouth on 22 October 1925.

Notes

References
 
 
 

 

A-class submarines (1903)
World War I submarines of the United Kingdom
Ships built in Barrow-in-Furness
Royal Navy ship names
1903 ships
Maritime incidents in 1920
British submarine accidents